The White Ring is a ski circuit in the area of Lech am Arlberg, Vorarlberg (Austria). It is located in the Ski Arlberg ski resort. With 22 km, it is the longest ski round trip in the world. It features 5,500 m of altitude difference. The circuit comprises 5 downhill runs, 6 lifts, piste ascents and a cross-country ski run.

The original idea for the ski circuit stems from Vorarlberg ski pioneer Sepp Bildstein. The realisation began with the commissioning of the first drag lift in the winter of 1940/41.

The course

The race 
For the 50th anniversary of the ski circuit, the first White Ring ski race was held in the 2005/2006 season. 1,000 skiers participate in the event. The course record is 44:10:75 minutes and held since 2010 by Markus Weiskopf.

The previous White Ring race was held on Jan 15th, 2022.

The next White Ring race will be held on Jan 21st, 2023.

Speed Race 
Two days in advance of the actual race, all racers are invited to test their speed. Among the 1,000 participants, the first 100 race numbers are awarded to the 100 fast athletes. Spectators watch the racers along the 2 km track and at the finish in Zürs.

External links 
 Website of the Ski Arlberg ski area
 "Schuss jetzt!" – Report of the White Ring, Die Zeit, 2007

References 

Sport in Vorarlberg
Skiing in Austria